Al Qunaytirah may refer to:

Quneitra, Syria
Al Qunaytirah, Jordan